Good Time Harry is an American sitcom that aired on NBC from July 19, 1980, to September 13, 1980.

Premise
The series centered on Harry Jenkins, a sportswriter for the San Francisco Sentinel whose playboy escapades often got in the way of his work. Others seen were Jimmy Hughes, Harry's editor; Carol, another reporter; Martin, the copy boy; and Sally, Hughes's secretary.

Cast
Ted Bessell as Harry Jenkins
Eugene Roche as Jimmy Hughes
Marcia Strassman as Carol Younger
Jesse Welles as Billie Howard
Ruth Manning as Sally
Steven Peterman as Martin Springer

References

NBC original programming
1980s American sitcoms
1980 American television series debuts
1980 American television series endings
English-language television shows
Television series about journalism
Television shows set in San Francisco
Television series by Universal Television